The 1963 Milwaukee Braves season was the 11th in Milwaukee and the 93th overall season of the franchise.

The sixth-place Braves finished the season with an  record, fifteen games behind the National League and World Series champion  The season's home attendance was  ninth in the ten-team National League.

Offseason 
 October 11, 1962: Ron Hunt was purchased from the Braves by the New York Mets.
 November 26, 1962: Ellis Burton was drafted from the Braves by the Houston Colt .45s in the 1962 rule 5 draft.
 November 26, 1962: 1962 first-year draft
Hal Haydel was drafted from the Braves by the Houston Colt .45s.
Don Taussig was drafted by the Braves from the Houston Colt .45s.
 November 30, 1962: Jim Bolger, Don Nottebart, and Connie Grob were traded by the Braves to the Houston Colt .45s for Norm Larker.
 Prior to 1963 season: Lou Klimchock was acquired from the Braves by the Washington Senators.

Ownership change and managerial turnover
On November 16, 1962, the 17-year tenure of Louis Perini as owner of the Braves ended when the Boston construction magnate sold the team to a Chicago-based group of investors led by  The Braves' home attendance had been declining since its 1957 high-water mark of over 2.2 million fans to 767,000 in five short years, due to a drop-off in on-field success since its last postseason appearance (the 1959 NL playoff) and a ban on "bringing your own" food and beer to County Stadium.  Within two years of buying the Braves, the Bartholomay group would be negotiating with Atlanta, in a successful bid to move the club to the Southeast as early as 1965.

The change in owners overshadowed the Braves' continued turbulence in the managerial chair.

In a 1976 memoir, longtime Dodger executive Harold Parrott would claim that the Braves' hiring of Bragan after the 1962 season was orchestrated by Branch Rickey to thwart a plan by Dodger owner Walter O'Malley to replace his manager, eventual Hall of Famer Walter Alston, with Leo Durocher. O'Malley was strongly considering firing Alston, but only if he could find a suitable "soft landing spot" for him. He chose the Braves, looking to replace Tebbetts, as Alston's ideal destination. But, according to Parrott, Rickey—in semi-retirement but still O'Malley's bitter enemy—discovered the scheme and brokered the marriage between Bragan and the Braves' ownership before O'Malley's plan could materialize.

Regular season 
 April 16, 1963: Eddie Mathews hit the 400th home run of his career. Along with Duke Snider, Mathews became part of the first duo to reach the 400 plateau in the same season.

Season standings

Record vs. opponents

Notable transactions 
 May 6, 1963: Lou Klimchock was returned to the Braves by the Washington Senators.
 May 8, 1963: Lou Johnson and cash were traded by the Braves to the Detroit Tigers for Chico Fernández.
 May 8, 1963: Chico Fernández was traded by the Braves to the New York Mets for Larry Foss.
 August 8, 1963: Norm Larker was purchased from the Braves by the San Francisco Giants.

Roster

Player stats

Batting

Starters by position 
Note: Pos = Position; G = Games played; AB = At bats; H = Hits; Avg. = Batting average; HR = Home runs; RBI = Runs batted in

Other batters 
Note: G = Games played; AB = At bats; H = Hits; Avg. = Batting average; HR = Home runs; RBI = Runs batted in

Pitching

Starting pitchers 
Note: G = Games pitched; IP = Innings pitched; W = Wins; L = Losses; ERA = Earned run average; SO = Strikeouts

Other pitchers 
Note: G = Games pitched; IP = Innings pitched; W = Wins; L = Losses; ERA = Earned run average; SO = Strikeouts

Relief pitchers 
Note: G = Games pitched; W = Wins; L = Losses; SV = Saves; ERA = Earned run average; SO = Strikeouts

Awards and honors 
All-Star Game
Hank Aaron, outfield, starter
Warren Spahn, reserve
Joe Torre, reserve

Farm system 

LEAGUE CHAMPIONS: Yakima, Greenville

Notes

References 

1963 Milwaukee Braves season at Baseball Reference

Milwaukee Braves seasons
Milwaukee Braves season
Milwauk